The ADM formalism (named for its authors Richard Arnowitt, Stanley Deser and Charles W. Misner) is a Hamiltonian formulation of general relativity that plays an important role in canonical quantum gravity and numerical relativity. It was first published in 1959.

The comprehensive review of the formalism that the authors published in 1962 has been reprinted in the journal General Relativity and Gravitation, while the original papers can be found in the archives of Physical Review.

Overview
The dynamic variables of this theory are taken to be the metric tensor of three-dimensional spatial slices  and their conjugate momenta . Using these variables it is possible to define a Hamiltonian, and thereby write the equations of motion for general relativity in the form of Hamilton's equations.

These describe how each of the "leaves"  of the foliation of spacetime are welded together. The equations of motion for these variables can be freely specified; this freedom corresponds to the freedom to specify how to lay out the coordinate system in space and time.

Notation
Most references adopt notation in which four dimensional tensors are written in abstract index notation, and that Greek indices are spacetime indices taking values (0, 1, 2, 3) and Latin indices are spatial indices taking values (1, 2, 3).  In the derivation here, a superscript (4) is prepended to quantities that typically have both a three-dimensional and a four-dimensional version, such as the metric tensor for three-dimensional slices  and the metric tensor for the full four-dimensional spacetime .

The text here uses Einstein notation in which summation over repeated indices is assumed.

Two types of derivatives are used:  Partial derivatives are denoted either by the operator  or by subscripts preceded by a comma.  Covariant derivatives are denoted either by the operator  or by subscripts preceded by a semicolon.

Derivation

Lagrangian formulation
The starting point for the ADM formulation is the Lagrangian

which is a product of the square root of the determinant of the four-dimensional metric tensor for the full spacetime and its Ricci scalar. This is the Lagrangian from the Einstein–Hilbert action.

The desired outcome of the derivation is to define an embedding of three-dimensional spatial slices in the four-dimensional spacetime. The metric of the three-dimensional slices

will be the generalized coordinates for a Hamiltonian formulation. The conjugate momenta can then be computed as

using standard techniques and definitions. The symbols  are Christoffel symbols associated with the metric of the full four-dimensional spacetime. The lapse

and the shift vector

are the remaining elements of the four-metric tensor.

Having identified the quantities for the formulation, the next step is to rewrite the Lagrangian in terms of these variables. The new expression for the Lagrangian

is conveniently written in terms of the two new quantities

and

which are known as the Hamiltonian constraint and the momentum constraint respectively. The lapse and the shift appear in the Lagrangian as Lagrange multipliers.

Equations of motion
Although the variables in the Lagrangian represent the metric tensor on three-dimensional spaces embedded in the four-dimensional spacetime, it is possible and desirable to use the usual procedures from Lagrangian mechanics to derive "equations of motion" that describe the time evolution of both the metric  and its conjugate momentum .  The result

and

is a non-linear set of partial differential equations.

Taking variations with respect to the lapse and shift provide constraint equations

and

and the lapse and shift themselves can be freely specified, reflecting the fact that coordinate systems can be freely specified in both space and time.

Applications

Application to quantum gravity

Using the ADM formulation, it is possible to attempt to construct a quantum theory of gravity in the same way that one constructs the Schrödinger equation corresponding to a given Hamiltonian in quantum mechanics. That is, replace the canonical momenta  and the spatial metric functions by linear functional differential operators

More precisely, the replacing of classical variables by operators is restricted by commutation relations. The hats represent operators in quantum theory. This leads to the Wheeler–DeWitt equation.

Application to numerical solutions of the Einstein equations

There are relatively few known exact solutions to the Einstein field equations. In order to find other solutions, there is an active field of study known as numerical relativity in which supercomputers are used to find approximate solutions to the equations.  In order to construct such solutions numerically, most researchers start with a formulation of the Einstein equations closely related to the ADM formulation.  The most common approaches start with an initial value problem based on the ADM formalism.

In Hamiltonian formulations, the basic point is replacement of set of second order equations by another first order set of equations. We may get this second set of equations by Hamiltonian formulation in an easy way. Of course this is very useful for numerical physics, because reducing the order of differential equations is often convenient if we want to prepare equations for a computer.

ADM energy and mass

ADM energy is a special way to define the energy in general relativity, which is only applicable to some special geometries of spacetime that asymptotically approach a well-defined metric tensor at infinity – for example a spacetime that asymptotically approaches Minkowski space. The ADM energy in these cases is defined as a function of the deviation of the metric tensor from its prescribed asymptotic form. In other words, the ADM energy is computed as the strength of the gravitational field at infinity.

If the required asymptotic form is time-independent (such as the Minkowski space itself), then it respects the time-translational symmetry. Noether's theorem then implies that the ADM energy is conserved. According to general relativity, the conservation law for the total energy does not hold in more general, time-dependent backgrounds – for example, it is completely violated in physical cosmology. Cosmic inflation in particular is able to produce energy (and mass) from "nothing" because the vacuum energy density is roughly constant, but the volume of the Universe grows exponentially.

Application to modified gravity
By using the ADM decomposition and introducing extra auxiliary fields, in 2009 Deruelle et al. found a method to find the Gibbons–Hawking–York boundary term for modified gravity theories "whose Lagrangian is an arbitrary function of the Riemann tensor".

See also
 Canonical coordinates
 Hamilton–Jacobi–Einstein equation
 Peres metric

Notes

References
 

Mathematical methods in general relativity
Formalism (deductive)